Smoke & Mirrors is The Datsuns' third studio album, released on 9 October 2006.

Track listing
"Who Are You Stamping Your Foot For?"
"System Overload"
"Waiting for Your Time to Come"
"Stuck Here For Days"
"Maximum Heartbreak"
"All Aboard"
"Such A Pretty Curse"
"Blood Red"
"Emperor's New Clothes"
"Too Little Fire"

Charts

References

2006 albums
The Datsuns albums
V2 Records albums